5 and Up is a Philippine television informative show broadcast by GMA Network. It premiered on May 16, 1992 on ABC and later moved to GMA Network. The show concluded in 2003.

Hosts

Alex Amado
Alwien Raidene Lacanilao 
Anya Benitez
Arthur Anthony Cipriano
Atom Araullo
Byron Abao
Carlo Mendoza
Chiyomi Rances
Chuck Grey
Chynna Ortaleza
Diego Maranan
Eliza Agabin
Enzo Marcos
Frances Fleta
Giancarlo Hilario
Giggles Arceo
Ian Tugas
Jennifer Cremen
Jessica Gallegos
Jolly Estaris
John Laurence Patulan
Joseton Vergel de Dios
Josh Matic
Justine de Jesus
Kai de Veyra
Krianne Maniego
Lily Anne Casimiro
Luigi Exconde
Luz Yballe
Maureen Araneta
Maxene Magalona
Melvin Abundo
Nicai de Guzman
Nina Serquina
Nina Torres
Oly Fernando
Pamela Cajilig
Paolo Olbes
Patrick da Silva
Phoebe Cabaluna
Rayver Cruz
Rex Sayson
Rodjun Cruz
Rookie Camaclang 
Rupert Eustaquio
Satin Abad
Tin Tin Leones
Veronica Dorotheo
Wilroy Dilao
Xavi Gonzalez
Zak Yuson

Producers
 Marga Ortigas
 Teret Pena-Pison
 Grace M. Leung
 Yasmin Mapua-Tang
 Data Tolentino-Canlas 
 Inky Santiago-Nakpil
 Lengo Nunez
 Pauline Mangilog-Saltarin 
 Anabell Rubiano-Maldonado
 Auey Calabia-Santos
 Priscilla Ruiz-Bangad
 Ian Roxas
 Amee Marcelo
 Jay Orense
 Jing Ventura
 Tin Macatulad
 Tops Brugada 
 Eva Marie Ercilla
 Peejo Pilar
 Gisele Aro-Oruga
 Marj Mosura-Dumont
 Agay-Llanera Reyes
 Jason Reyes
 Tet Salvador

Accolades

Highly Recommended, Asian Television Awards (1999, 2002)
Best Children's Show, PMPC Star Awards for TV (1992–93, 1994–96, 1999–2003)
Winner, KBP Golden Dove Awards (1992–2002)
Winner, Catholic Mass Media Awards (1992–2002)
Gold Medal Award, New York Festival (1996)
Winner, Gawad CCP Para Sa Telebisyon (1992-2000)

References

External links
 

1992 Philippine television series debuts
2003 Philippine television series endings
Filipino-language television shows
GMA Network original programming
Philippine children's television series
TV5 (Philippine TV network) original programming